Christopher Paul Hadley Brown, CBE (born 15 April 1948) is a British art historian and academic. He was director of the Ashmolean Museum in Oxford, England from 1998 to 2014. He is recognised as an authority on Sir Anthony van Dyck.

Early life
Brown was born on 15 April 1948, in Tangier, Morocco. His father flew Spitfires during World War II and joined civil aviation in the post war period, flying for Gibraltar Airways and British European Airways. He was educated at Merchant Taylors' School, an all-boys public school in Hertfordshire. He then matriculated into St Catherine's College, Oxford to study history. In 1966, he graduated from the University of Oxford with a Bachelor of Arts (BA) degree in Modern History. This was later promoted to Master of Arts (MA Oxon) as per tradition. He remained at St Catherine's to complete a Diploma in Art History. He then undertook post-graduate research at the Courtauld Institute of Art and completed his Doctor of Philosophy (PhD) degree.

Career
From 1971 to 1998, he worked at the National Gallery, London; first as Curator of 17th-century Dutch and Flemish paintings, eventually as Chief Curator. He was appointed director of the Ashmolean Museum in Oxford in 1998 and it was largely due to his drive, determination and fundraising that the museum, especially the front part, was so spectacularly rebuilt.

Brown sits on the Prix Pictet advisory board.

Honours
In the 2011 New Year Honours, Brown was appointed commander of the Order of the British Empire (CBE) 'for services to museums'.

He is an honorary fellow of his alma mater St Catherine's College, Oxford.

Bibliography
Brown's works include:

 
 
 
  (co-author with Anthony Turner)

Translations
 

He has also had articles published in a number of journals, including The Times and The Times Literary Supplement.

References

1948 births
Living people
People from Tangier
People educated at Merchant Taylors' School, Northwood
Alumni of St Catherine's College, Oxford
English curators
British art curators
People associated with the National Gallery, London
People associated with the Ashmolean Museum
Directors of museums in the United Kingdom
Commanders of the Order of the British Empire